is a film based on 's memoir, 1 Litre no Namida.

Asae Ōnishi is the lead actress, starring as Aya Kito. 9th grader (third year of junior high school) Aya Kito collapses on the way to school. Dr. Yamamoto discovers that Aya has spinocerebellar ataxia, a fatal and incurable disease that handicaps the body. Aya's mother,  and Dr. Yamamoto let Aya record in a diary to tell her story and to live her life to the fullest.

References

External links
 
 
 Information about A Litre of Tears

Medical-themed films
Films based on biographies
2000s Japanese films

ja:1リットルの涙#映画